Rita De Crescenzo is an Italian singer, songwriter and social media personality.

Career 
De Crescenzo’s musical career began on 8 June 2021 with the release of her first single "Ma te vulisse fa na gara e ballo?" along with the official music video that reached more than 6 million views. The single was trending for months on the social platform TikTok.

On June 28, she released "Fiocchi di neve", always through the label YouTube channel.
About a month later, on August 13, 2021, his third single "Guagliù menate 'o sale" was released and on December 3, 2021 "Wata wata".

On March 23, 2022 the video of "Sti follower" was released, on July 11 "Io sto sclerando" was released, a sample of "Shekerando", song by the Italian singer Rhove.

On September 9, 2022, she founded and inaugurated her own brand, Svergognata Shop by Rita de Crescenzo, with a first store in Naples. During the inauguration celebration De Crescenzo arrived at the shop dressed as a queen, with a white dress, a long cloak and a crown, event that caused criticism as the clumsy crowd blew up the traffic in the center of Naples.

On September 21, "Ma chi site" was released, on December 8, the Christmas song "Buone feste" was released and ultimately, on December 15, "Chi me la fatte fa e me spusà" (feat. Daniel Colangeli) was released.

Personal life 
She is married and has 3 sons. She is a strong supporter of the LGBTQ+ community. She was invited to be the "godmother" at the 2022 Naples Pride.

Discography

Studio albums

Singles

As lead artist 
 2021 – "Ma te vulisse fa na gara e ballo"
 2021 – "Fiocchi di neve"
 2021 – "Guagliù menate o sale"
 2021 – "Wata wata"
 2022 – "Sti follower"
 2022 – "Io sto sclerando"
 2022 – "Ma chi site"
 2022 – "Buone feste"
 2022 – "Chi me la fatte fa e me spusà" (feat. Daniel Colangeli)"

 As featured artist

 2022 – "Chi me la fatte fa e me spusà" (feat. Daniel Colangeli)"

References

External links 

  

People from the Province of Naples
Living people
21st-century Italian singers
1979 births